Engelandvaarder, (literally translated as "England sailer") was the term given during the Second World War to men and women who attempted to escape from the Netherlands across over 100 miles of the North Sea to reach England and freedom. Only about one in ten were successful in the crossing, with most just disappearing in the sea. Once they reached England many joined the Allied forces to help free their country from Nazi Germany. The period covered is between the capitulation of the Dutch armed forces on 15 May 1940 and the Allied invasion of Normandy on 6 June 1944 (D-Day).

In July 1940 three Dutchmen escaped from the occupied Netherlands and crossed the North Sea to England in a twelve-foot boat. They were called "Engelandvaarders". This first success encouraged many others to try the crossing. Most of these disappeared and were never heard from again. With time, land routes out of the Netherlands developed, and a number of the Dutch reached England by traveling overland from safe house to safe house to reach southern France, Spain, Portugal, Switzerland or Sweden and from the neutral country transited to England.

A large number of men and women, however, were killed or arrested on their way to England. Many died at sea. Some were captured by the Germans. Of these, some were shot, but most were deported to concentration camps. Some escaped from detention, such as Bram van der Stok, the most successful Dutch fighter pilot in World War II, who escaped with Bodo Sandberg and four other Engelandvaarders from the prisoner of war camp Stalag Luft III, in a car stolen from the camp commander. Many others were taken to death camps, of whom only a few returned to the Netherlands after the liberation.

Upon arriving in England these Engelandvaarders were interrogated by British secret service to be sure Nazi Germany had not slipped a secret agent among their number. This was done in London at the "London Reception Centre" in the building over a period of four years. Once they cleared the interview process they all had a meeting with Queen Wilhelmina, who viewed them as her window back to her homeland. A number of the Engelandvaarders were awarded the Dutch Bronze Cross (BK) or the Cross of Merit (KV). 

Over 1,700 Dutch men and women overcame many difficulties to reach England. Of these 332 joined the Royal Army, 118 the Royal Air Force, 397 the Royal Navy, 176 the Royal Netherlands East Indies Army (KNIL) and 164 the merchant navy. 129 served with the Dutch government-in-exile in London. 111 became secret agents and returned to occupied Netherlands.

Notable Engelandvaarders

Museum Engelandvaarders
On 4 September 2015 the Museum Engelandvaarders was inaugurated by King Willem-Alexander in the Dutch town of Noordwijk to commemorate the Engelandvaarders. The museum is in a former munition bunker which was part of the Atlantic Wall.

Soldier of Orange
The Soldier of Orange (Soldaat van Oranje) is a book written by Erik Hazelhoff Roelfzema, first published in 1971. In 1977 the book was made into a movie by Dutch director Paul Verhoeven. It starred Rutger Hauer in the part of Erik. 

In 2010 it was produced on the stage as a musical. The musical is performed in a Theaterhangar on the former airfield Valkenburg near Katwijk and has since attracted more than 3 million visitors. The running date has been extended multiple times, with the current ending planned for March 2021.

Citations

Bibliography
 Tucker, Spencer C. World War II: The Definitive Encyclopedia and Document Collection Santa Barbara, California : ABC-CLIO, (2014).

Further reading
 De Schakel, by Frank Visser (1976)
 Vrijheid achter de horizon, by Jan Bruin and Jan van der Werff (1998)
 Tulpen voor Wilhelmina, by Agnes Dessing (2005)
 Wij zijn niet bang, tenminste, niet erg. Het Engelandvaardersdagboek van Daniël de Moulin (2006, herdruk 2015)
 Engelandvaarders en vluchtelingen, de Noordzee-route, by Pauline L van Till and Harald S van der Straaten (2015)

External links

 A Hard Fought Ship
 The musical
 Engelandvaarder Museum
 Klim naar de Vrijheid - interviews with Engelandvaarders

 
Military history of the Netherlands during World War II
Dutch words and phrases